Water chestnut cake  is a sweet Cantonese dim sum dish made of shredded Chinese water chestnut. When served during dim sum, the cake is usually cut into square-shaped slices and pan-fried before serving.  The cake is soft, but holds its shape after the frying. Sometimes the cake is made with chopped water chestnuts embedded into each square piece with the vegetable being visible. One of the main trademark characteristics of the dish is its translucent appearance.

It is one of the standard dishes found in the dim sum cuisine of Hong Kong, and is also available in select overseas Chinatown restaurants.

See also
 Chestnut cake
 Brazil nut cake
 Dim sum
 Taro cake
 Turnip cake
 Nian gao

References

Dim sum
Cantonese cuisine
Hong Kong cuisine